Reasons in the Sun is the first and only studio album by Glen or Glenda. It was released in 1998 by Shimmy Disc. It is a collaboration between musician and producer Kramer and vocalist Tammy Lang.

Track listing

Personnel 
Adapted from Reasons in the Sun liner notes.

Glen or Glenda
 Kramer – vocals, guitars, bass guitar, keyboards, flute, tape, percussion, production, engineering
 Tammy Lang – vocals, tambourine

Additional musicians
 Deni Bonet – violin, viola (4, 5, 10, 12, 16, 17)
 David Licht – drums, percussion (1, 12)
 Billy Ficca – drums (11)
 Tess Mattisson – backing vocals (14)
 Mark McCarron – guitar (8, 9, 11, 14, 16, 17)

Production and design
Alan Douches – mastering
Jad Fair – cover art
Macioce – photography

Release history

References

External links 
 Reasons in the Sun at Discogs (list of releases)

1998 albums
Kramer (musician) albums
Albums produced by Kramer (musician)
Shimmy Disc albums